How's Your Process? (Play) is the second part of the second studio album by alternative rock band Dot Hacker and the second of a two-album series. The album was released on October 7, 2014 on ORG Music label in digital, CD, cassette, and 12″ vinyl formats.

Josh Klinghoffer stated in an interview that How's Your Process was intended to be released as a single album, but was split into two when the band could not agree on which songs to include:

Klinghoffer also revealed that the cover is a photograph by Ryszard Horowitz, which the band discovered in an article from a 1969 issue of Esquire magazine.

Track listing

Personnel 
 Dot Hacker
 Josh Klinghoffer – lead vocals, guitar, keyboards, synthesizers
 Clint Walsh – guitar, backing vocals, synthesizers
 Jonathan Hischke – bass guitar
 Eric Gardner – drums

 Additional musicians
 Vanessa Freebairn-Smith – string arrangements
 Sonus Quartet – strings

 Production
 Eric Palmquist – engineer, mixing
 Bernie Grundman – mastering

 Artwork
 Ryszard Horowitz – Photography
 Astrelle Johnquest – Design

References 

2014 albums
Dot Hacker albums